Caleta Blanco Airport ,  is an airport serving the villages of Puerto Aguirre (es) and Caleta Andrade (es) on Isla Las Huichas (es), an island in the Aysén Region of Chile.

Isla Las Huichas is in the Chonos Archipelago, on the east side of the Moraleda Channel.

It is not aligned with the runway. Approach and departures are over the water.

See also

Transport in Chile
List of airports in Chile

References

External links
OpenStreetMap - Caleta Andrade
OurAirports - Caleta Blanco
SkyVector - Caleta Andrade
FallingRain - Caleta Blanco Airport

Airports in Aysén Region